Clifftop is an unincorporated community in Fayette County, West Virginia, United States.

Attractions
It is the home of historic Camp Washington-Carver Complex, which hosts the Appalachian String Band Music Festival the first weekend in August. This community is also home of Babcock State Park.

Notes

External links
Camp Washington-Carver Virtual Museum Exhibit

Unincorporated communities in Fayette County, West Virginia
Unincorporated communities in West Virginia